Kai Rossen is a German chemist currently the Editor-in-Chief of American Chemical Society's Organic Process Research & Development since 2015. His research interests involve medical chemistry.

Education
He earned his Diploma in Chemistry from the University of Düsseldorf, M.S. from University of North Carolina at Chapel Hill and his Ph.D from Cornell University. He has held positions at Merck, Sanofi and Degussa and Bayer.

References

University of North Carolina at Chapel Hill alumni
Cornell University alumni
21st-century German chemists
Living people
Year of birth missing (living people)